Diabetes, Metabolic Syndrome and Obesity: Targets and Therapy is a peer-reviewed medical journal covering research on diabetes, metabolic syndromes, and obesity. The journal was established in 2008 and is published by Dove Medical Press.

External links 
 

English-language journals
Open access journals
Dove Medical Press academic journals
Publications established in 2008
Endocrinology journals